Charles Walters was a footballer who played for Gainsborough Trinity and Burslem Port Vale at the end of the 19th century.

Career
Walters scored goals in 18 Second Division games for Gainsborough Trinity in the 1898–99 season. He joined Burslem Port Vale in July 1899. He scored three goals in 13 Second Division and FA Cup appearances in the 1899–1900 season. His goals came in a 3–1 win over Loughborough at the Athletic Ground (25 November), in a 2–2 draw at Burton Swifts (17 February), and in a 3–1 home win over Crewe Alexandra in an FA Cup qualifier (22 November). Never being anything more than a back-up striker, he departed at the season's close.

Career statistics
Source:

References

Year of birth missing
Year of death missing
English footballers
Association football forwards
Gainsborough Trinity F.C. players
Port Vale F.C. players
English Football League players